The  is a collection of wind turbines located on the peaks of mountains along the Sadamisaki Peninsula, in the town of Ikata, Ehime Prefecture, Japan.  The windfarm borders the Seto Wind Hill Park.

The installation consists of 11 Mitsubishi Heavy Industries MWT-1000s with a nameplate capacity of 1000 kW. They were erected starting September 2002, and began full operation in October 2003.

See also

Nunobiki Plateau Wind Farm
Aoyama Plateau Wind Farm

References

External links
Ikata's Wind Power Initiative 
Seto Wind Hill Park webcams

Wind farms in Japan
Buildings and structures in Ehime Prefecture
Ikata, Ehime
Energy infrastructure completed in 2003
2003 establishments in Japan